Marc-Kevin Goellner and David Prinosil were the defending champions, but chose not to participate that year.

Olivier Delaître and Guy Forget won in the final 6–4, 7–6, against Andrew Florent and Mark Petchey.

Seeds

  Martin Damm /  Cyril Suk (quarterfinals)
  Yevgeny Kafelnikov /  David Rikl (first round)
  Scott Melville /  Brad Pearce (first round)
  Shelby Cannon /  Dave Randall (quarterfinals)

Draw

Draw

References

External links
 ITF tournament edition details

Doubles